Santa Marta Airport  is an airstrip  southeast of San Carlos, a town in the Bío Bío Region of Chile.

See also

Transport in Chile
List of airports in Chile

References

External links
OpenStreetMap - Santa Marta Airport
OurAirports - Santa Marta Airport
FallingRain - Santa Marta Airport

Airports in Chile
Airports in Ñuble Region